Sebastian Kislinger  (born 1 August 1988) is an Austrian snowboarder.
 
He competed in the 2015 and 2017 FIS Snowboard World Championships, and in the 2018 Winter Olympics, in parallel giant slalom.

References

External links

1988 births
Living people
Austrian male snowboarders 
Olympic snowboarders of Austria 
Snowboarders at the 2018 Winter Olympics 
Universiade gold medalists for Austria
Universiade medalists in snowboarding
Competitors at the 2011 Winter Universiade
Competitors at the 2015 Winter Universiade